Cullybackey High School is a secondary school in the village of Cullybackey, in County Antrim, Northern Ireland.  It was established in 1968.

Awards and recognition
Cullybackey High School was recognized in 2003 by the BT Group Education Programme Schools Awards for its "School Democracy" project, which was developed in conjunction with elections to the Northern Ireland Assembly. In addition to information shared by way of the school newsletter and website, the students ran an Internet Awareness Evening for the parents of all school-aged children in the school's area.

References

External links

 Inspection report for Cullybackey High School

Secondary schools in County Antrim
Educational institutions established in 1968
1968 establishments in Northern Ireland